The artistic swimming competition at the 2018 Central American and Caribbean Games was held in Barranquilla, Colombia from 28 July to 2 August at the Complejo Acuático.

Medal summary

Medal table

References

External links
2018 Central American and Caribbean Games – Artistic swimming
Results book

2018 Central American and Caribbean Games events
Central American and Caribbean Games
2018
Qualification tournaments for the 2019 Pan American Games